The IPSC Finnish Rifle Championship is an IPSC level 3 championship held once a year by the Finnish Shooting Sport Federation.

Champions 
The following is a list of current and previous champions.

Overall category

Junior category

Senior category

See also 
IPSC Finnish Handgun Championship
IPSC Finnish Shotgun Championship
IPSC Finnish Tournament Championship
IPSC Finnish Action Air Championship

References 

Match Results  - 2004 IPSC Nordic Rifle Championship
Match Results  - 2005 IPSC Finnish Rifle Championship
Match Results  - 2006 IPSC Finnish Rifle Championship
Match Results  - 2007 IPSC Nordic Rifle Championship
Match Results  - 2008 IPSC Finnish Rifle Championship
Match Results  - 2009 IPSC Finnish Rifle Championship
Match Results  - 2011 IPSC Finnish 3-Gun Championship (Rifle results)
Match Results  - 2012 IPSC Finnish Rifle Championship
Match Results  - 2013 IPSC Finnish Rifle Championship
Match Results  - 2014 IPSC Nordic Rifle Championship

IPSC shooting competitions
National shooting championships
Finland sport-related lists
Shooting competitions in Finland